Bojan Simić (Serbian Cyrillic: Бојан Симић; born 26 September 1976) is a Serbian footballer.

Previously he has played with Serbian clubs FK Hajduk Beograd, FK Budućnost Banatski Dvor, FK Metalac Gornji Milanovac, FK Sevojno and FK Mladost Lučani, and also abroad with Bosnian FK Leotar, Kazakh FC Irtysh Pavlodar and Moldavian FC Zimbru Chișinău.

External links
 Profile at Srbijafudbal 
 

1976 births
Living people
Sportspeople from Leskovac
Serbian footballers
Serbian SuperLiga players
FK Hajduk Beograd players
FK Budućnost Banatski Dvor players
FK Metalac Gornji Milanovac players
FK Sevojno players
FK Mladost Lučani players
FK Mladi Radnik players
FK Leotar players
FC Irtysh Pavlodar players
Expatriate footballers in Kazakhstan
FC Zimbru Chișinău players
Expatriate footballers in Moldova
Association football defenders
Serbian expatriate sportspeople in Moldova
Serbian expatriate sportspeople in Kazakhstan
Serbian expatriate footballers